Callicarpa mollis is a species of beautyberry that is cultivated and grown in gardens and parks as ornamental plant. It has purple flowers. It is found in Korea and Japan.

References

External links
 Callicarpa mollis info
Callicarpa mollis information

mollis
Flora of Korea
Flora of Japan
Garden plants of Asia